Star Trek: The Magazine was an authorized monthly tabloid-size periodical published in the United States and Canada by Fabbri Publishing (US) devoted to the Star Trek franchise.  It ran for 48 issues, from May 1999 through April 2003, covering nearly 5,000 pages.  There were three volumes, the first with 24 issues, and the latter two with 12 issues each.

The magazine was notable for its exclusive interviews with actors and production crew.  Each issue also featured detailed technical briefings, many of which were lifted from the European Star Trek Fact Files.  Advertisements in ST:TM were scarce.

A significant feature of later issues was the "Starfleet Technical Database", written by Rick Sternbach.  The lengthy articles provided exclusive backstory and carry the same semi-canon weight as the technical manuals, which he also contributed to.  Some of his material was reclaimed from an abandoned Star Trek: Voyager Technical Manual.

Contents
The issues listed below are intended as a general reference and are not exhaustive.

Volume 1

Volume 2

Volume 3

References

Defunct science fiction magazines published in the United States
Magazines established in 1999
Magazines disestablished in 2003
Science fiction-related magazines
Star Trek reference books
Monthly magazines published in the United States
1999 establishments in the United States